Cnidoscolus fragrans was a tree endemic to the area around Havana, Cuba. It was originally described from the area of Regla on the eastern side of Havana Bay over 150 years ago.

References

Manihoteae
Endemic flora of Cuba
Trees of Cuba
Extinct flora of North America
Plant extinctions since 1500